Historia de una noche is a 1941 Argentine film directed by Luis Saslavsky.

In a survey of the 100 greatest films of Argentine cinema carried out by the Museo del Cine Pablo Ducrós Hicken in 2000, the film reached the 43rd position.

Plot
A man returns to his village after a long time and meets his ex-girlfriend, now married to a husband in desperate economic situation.

Cast
 Santiago Arrieta		
 Eliane Arroyo		
 María Esther Buschiazzo		
 Sebastián Chiola		
 Victoria Cuenca		
 Rafael Frontaura		
 Alfredo Jordan		
 Pedro López Lagar		
 Felisa Mary		
 Sabina Olmos		
 Raimundo Pastore		
 Elvira Quiroga		
 Renée Sutil
 Ramón J. Garay
 Claudio Martino

References

External links
 

1941 films
1940s Spanish-language films
Argentine black-and-white films
Argentine films based on plays
Argentine drama films
1941 drama films
1940s Argentine films